Cyperus elephantinus is a species of sedge that is native to northern parts of South Africa.

See also 
 List of Cyperus species

References 

elephantinus
Plants described in 1909
Flora of South Africa
Taxa named by Charles Baron Clarke